Ahn Jin-hui (born 6 March 1991) is a South Korean ice hockey player currently playing for Anyang Halla of Asia League Ice Hockey. He competed in the 2018 Winter Olympics.

References

External links
 

1991 births
Living people
Ice hockey players at the 2018 Winter Olympics
South Korean ice hockey right wingers
Olympic ice hockey players of South Korea
HL Anyang players
21st-century South Korean people